Apocryptes bato is a species of mudskipper native to India, Bangladesh and Myanmar where it can be found in tropical rivers, estuaries and coastal waters of the Indian Ocean.  This species can reach a length of  TL.  It is of minor importance to local commercial fisheries.  It is currently the only known member of its genus.

References

External links
 Photograph

Oxudercinae
Monotypic fish genera